"Anything Goes" is a song by the Australian hard rock group AC/DC. It is the fourth track from their album Black Ice. "Anything Goes" is one of five songs from the album that were played live on their Black Ice World Tour, however it was removed from the setlist on 25 October 2009 and was not played for the remainder of the tour. The single cover for Anything Goes is only the second AC/DC cover to feature frontman Brian Johnson alone (the 1986 re-release of "You Shook Me All Night Long" was the first); others have shown either the band or Angus Young.

The music video for "Anything Goes", which was released on Family Jewels Disc 3 as part of the 2009 box set Backtracks, was filmed live in Paris on 25 and 27 February by David Mallet.

"Anything Goes" was a last-time addition to Black Ice, written as the album was being recorded.

Track listing
Promo CD:
"Anything Goes" – 3:22
"Big Jack" – 3:57
"War Machine" – 3:10

Personnel
Brian Johnson – lead vocals
Angus Young – lead guitar
Malcolm Young – rhythm guitar, backing vocals
Cliff Williams – bass guitar, backing vocals
Phil Rudd – drums, percussion

Charts

References

2009 singles
AC/DC songs
Songs written by Angus Young
Songs written by Malcolm Young
Song recordings produced by Brendan O'Brien (record producer)
Columbia Records singles
2008 songs
Music videos directed by David Mallet (director)